2009 Indonesia earthquake may refer to:

 2009 Papua earthquakes (4 January), very large doublet in West Papua
 2009 Talaud Islands earthquake (12 February), large earthquake in North Sulawesi
 2009 West Java earthquake (2 September), by the south-west coast of Java
 2009 Sumatra earthquakes (30 September), west of Sumatra

See also
List of earthquakes in Indonesia